The 2008 Milton Keynes Council election took place on 1 May 2008 to elect members of Milton Keynes Unitary Council in Buckinghamshire, England. One third of the council – the 17 seats contested in the 2004 election – was up for election and the council, which totalled 51 seats, remained under no overall control.

After the election, the composition of the council was:
Liberal Democrat 21 (–1)
Conservative 20 (+5)
Labour 10 (–4)

Election result

References

2008 English local elections
2008
2000s in Buckinghamshire